Kevin Darnell Hart (born July 6, 1979) is an American comedian and actor. Originally known as a stand-up comedian, he has since starred in Hollywood films and on TV. He has also released several well-received comedy albums.

After winning several stand-up comedy competitions, Hart had his first breakthrough when Judd Apatow cast him in a recurring role on the TV series Undeclared (2001). He has since had roles in films such as Paper Soldiers (2002), Scary Movie 3 (2003), Soul Plane (2004), In the Mix (2005), Little Fockers (2010), Think Like a Man (2012), Grudge Match (2013), Ride Along (2014) About Last Night (2014), Get Hard (2015), Central Intelligence (2016), The Secret Life of Pets film franchise (2016–2019), Ride Along 2 (2016), Captain Underpants: The First Epic Movie (2017), the Jumanji film franchise (2017–present), and Night School (2018). He also created and starred as a fictionalized version of himself in Real Husbands of Hollywood (2013–2016).

Hart's comedic reputation continued to grow with the release of his first stand-up album I'm a Grown Little Man (2009). He has since released four more comedy albums: Seriously Funny (2010), Laugh at My Pain (2011), Let Me Explain (2013), and What Now? (2016). In 2015, Time magazine named him on its annual list of the 100 most influential people in the world. In 2017, he launched the Laugh Out Loud Network, a subscription video streaming service in partnership with Lionsgate.

Early life
Kevin Darnell Hart was born in Philadelphia on July 6, 1979, the son of Nancy (died 2007) and Henry Hart. He has an older brother named Robert. He was raised in a single-parent household by his mother, who worked as a systems analyst for the Office of Student Registration and Financial Services at the University of Pennsylvania. His father was a cocaine addict who was in and out of jail throughout most of Hart's childhood, prompting Hart to use humor as a way to cope with his troubled family life. His relationship with his father improved after his father recovered from his addiction. He would also later talk about his mother in his stand-up routine, portraying her as a loving yet intimidating woman. After graduating from George Washington High School, Hart briefly attended the Community College of Philadelphia before dropping out and moving to New York City. He then moved to Brockton, Massachusetts, and found work as a shoe salesman.

Career

Stand-up
Hart's first stand-up performance took place at The Laff House in his native Philadelphia under the name of Lil Kev, which did not go well. His career suffered a slow start and he was booed offstage several times, once even having a piece of chicken thrown at him. After those initial unsuccessful shows, he began entering comedy competitions throughout Massachusetts, with audience receptions eventually improving. It took time for Hart to develop a unique comedic style. After an early period of attempting to imitate comedians like Chris Tucker, he found his own rhythm by delving into his insecurities and life experiences. He said, "Because of what I do, it has to be an open book. But right now this is a book that is being written."

Hart's comedy tours began in 2009 with his act titled I'm a Grown Little Man, followed by Seriously Funny in 2010, Laugh at My Pain in 2011, and Let Me Explain in 2013, the last two of which were also released as features in movie theaters. Hart grossed over $15 million from "Laugh at My Pain", making it one of the year's top-selling comedy tours. Hart also has a game available through iTunes called "Little Jumpman". His Facebook page, Twitter account, and YouTube channel are all connected to and accessible through this app. Most overseas fans of Hart discovered him on YouTube, as well.

On April 9, 2015, Hart embarked on a comedy world tour titled the What Now? Tour at the AT&T Center in San Antonio, which concluded on August 7, 2016, at the Columbus Civic Center in Columbus, Georgia. On July 16, 2015, Universal Pictures announced that Kevin Hart: What Now?, a stand-up comedy film featuring a performance of Hart's What Now? Tour, would be theatrically released in the United States on October 14, 2016. The show was filmed live on August 30, 2015, in front of 53,000 people, at Philadelphia's Lincoln Financial Field.

Film and television roles

Hart came to prominence from his guest appearance in Undeclared. He made his film debut in the film Paper Soldiers. Hart then gained further recognition from his other films such as the Scary Movie franchise, Soul Plane, The 40-Year-Old Virgin, Death at a Funeral and Little Fockers. He turned down a role in the 2008 film Tropic Thunder because the character is gay, citing his own "insecurities".

He played Doug in the film The Five-Year Engagement (2012) and appeared in Think Like a Man which was a box office success. He also appeared in the sequel. He had a cameo as himself in This Is the End. In 2013, Hart played a boxing promoter in Grudge Match and appeared in Exit Strategy as Mannequin Head Man. He also appeared in 35 and Ticking.

In 2014, Hart starred as Ben in Ride Along, opposite Ice Cube. The film received generally negative reviews from critics, but was a major box office success. Hart returned in the sequel, Ride Along 2, which was released on January 15, 2016.

In 2013, Hart co-created Real Husbands of Hollywood with Chris Spencer. The show follows Hart along with other married celebrities (each playing a comical fictionalized version of themselves) within the series including: Boris Kodjoe, Nelly, Duane Martin, J.B. Smoove, Nick Cannon and Robin Thicke. Thicke did not return for the second season due to his music career, though Hart has stated that the door is open for Thicke to return. The series is intentionally filmed in a style similar to Bravo's The Real Housewives. Episodes often hinge on the "real" Hart's desperately unsuccessful attempts to climb Hollywood's celebrity social ladder (which always backfire in humiliating ways), and the character's barely-hidden jealousy of his more successful celebrity friends. A sneak peek was shown as a segment during the 2012 BET Awards and the official promo was released in October 2012.

In 2015, Hart starred in the films Get Hard with Will Ferrell and The Wedding Ringer. In 2016, he starred in the movies Central Intelligence, with Dwayne Johnson and the animated The Secret Life of Pets. In 2017, he starred in the movies Captain Underpants: The First Epic Movie, in a voice role, and Jumanji: Welcome to the Jungle with Jack Black, Karen Gillan, and reteaming again with Johnson. He earned an estimated $32.5 million in 2017.

In 2018, he produced his first film under his production company HartBeat Productions, Night School. In October 2018, it was announced that through his production company, he has signed a first-look deal with Nickelodeon. Under the deal, Hart and his HartBeat Productions banner will develop and produce live-action, scripted kids content for the network. Hart also has a first-look film deal with Universal Studios.

In 2019, Hart's film The Upside, his first headlining role in a drama, was theatrically released. It also starred Bryan Cranston and Nicole Kidman. Hart also reprised his role of Snowball in the sequel The Secret Life of Pets 2.

In 2021, Hart starred in Fatherhood, a drama about a man whose wife dies shortly after childbirth, leaving him to raise their daughter on his own. It premiered on Netflix on June 18, 2021.

In 2020, his series Die Hart premiered on Quibi on July 20 and had a great first weekend, with numerous households streaming the series. On June 9, ROKU and Hart's multi-platform comedy brand Laugh Out Loud returned the series to Roku with a second season.

In addition to returning to his starring role, Hart will also executive produce the second season; Laugh Out Loud CEO and Hart's longtime business partner, Jeff Clanagan, will serve as a producer on the project.

Hart later played Arnold Drummond in the Diff'rent Strokes portion of the third edition of Live in Front of a Studio Audience

In 2022, Hart starred alongside Mark Wahlberg in the comedy film, Me Time. The movie shows how Sonny experiences a wild journey with his friend after finding a much-longed free weekend.

Upcoming projects
As of October 2016, Hart was set to portray Santa Claus in Dashing Through the Snow, a planned 2017 Disney Christmas-themed film. In October 2018, it was reported that Chris Rock will direct Hart in a movie based on an original idea by the both of them. The film will be written by Black-ish writer Yamara Taylor and the film will revolve around a stay at home dad who raises the kids while his star CEO wife serves as the breadwinner. The man finds himself in emotional and public turmoil when his wife kicks him to the curb, and they engage in a bitter divorce and custody battle. In 2019, Hart signed on to star in and produce Monopoly, Black Friday, an untitled international romantic comedy, Extreme Job, and Scrooged. He signed a first look deal with Netflix in January 2021. Hart will star as a master thief in the Netflix comedy heist film Lift directed by F. Gary Gray alongside Úrsula Corberó from Money Heist and Vincent d'Onofrio. The film will premiere in August 2023.

Laugh Out Loud Productions 
In 2017, Hart founded Laugh Out Loud, a global media and production company to provide opportunities for top comedic talent of all ethnicities worldwide.  Originally partnered with Lionsgate, Hart became majority owner in 2019 after buying out most of the Liongate's stake. LOL spans the full range of media channels, including digital, audio, linear and experiential, with four divisions: LOL Network, LOL Studios, LOL Audio and LOL X!

Hart has aggressively expanded LOL's reach since its founding, securing partnership deals with PlutoTV, Roku, Snap, Facebook, Peacock, and YouTube. In 2020, he extended his company's agreement with Sirius XM. The network has launched successful programming, including Cold As Balls which has amassed over one billion YouTube views, Kevin Hart: Lyft Legend, What the Fit, and Straight From The Hart. LOL has won numerous accolades, including nominations and awards from the Producers Guild of America, Critics' Choice Movie Awards, Realscreen, Streamy, and Webby.

Known for content such as Cold As Balls, What the Fit, Die Hart, and more, the company has amassed more than 1 billion video views across its digital platforms and has worked with brand partners such as AT&T, Headspace, Lyft, Old Spice, P&G, and Viacom.

Hosting

In addition to acting, Hart has also hosted various ceremonies. Hart first hosted the 2011 BET Awards. Hart then hosted the 2012 MTV Video Music Awards. His longtime friend Judd Apatow, the director who gave him his first big on-screen break in the TV series Undeclared, was the one who recommended him for the gig. Hart hoped that this would project him further into a side career as an emcee, stating, "Hopefully after MTV, of course we're talking Emmys, Oscars, whatever." He has hosted three episodes of Saturday Night Live. In 2015, Hart hosted the Comedy Central Roast of Justin Bieber. In 2016, Hart co-hosted the 2016 MTV Movie Awards with Dwayne Johnson.

Hart has also hosted on HQ Trivia and gave away $100,000 to one person with Scott Rogowsky on September 26, 2018, which had 699K players.

On December 4, 2018, Hart was announced as the host of the 2019 Academy Awards. Two days later, however, he withdrew from hosting duties in the wake of backlash against him over several homophobic tweets he had posted between 2010 and 2011. He characterized the protest as unconstructive and argued, "If you don't believe people change, grow as they get older, I don't know what to tell you". On December 7, he tweeted an apology to the LGBTQ community following criticism for not issuing one the previous day. On January 3, 2019, Hart stated that he was going to reconsider stepping down as host, after openly lesbian comedian Ellen DeGeneres, who has hosted the Academy Awards multiple times, expressed support for him to do so and said she had contacted the Academy to ask if Hart would be able to reverse his decision if he wished and, according to DeGeneres, they said he would be able to do so. On January 8, following backlash for what was perceived as an insincere apology by critics, Hart confirmed that he would not be hosting the Academy Awards. That year's ceremony was ultimately held without a host.

On September 9, 2020, executives from the Muscular Dystrophy Association announced plans to relaunch their annual MDA telethon, move it to October 2020, and make Hart its new host, taking over duties that had been previously held from 1966 to 2010 by comedian and former National MDA Chairman, Jerry Lewis. Entitled The MDA Kevin Hart Kids Telethon, the new two-hour telethon will be seen exclusively through participating social media platforms; the event was held on October 24, 2020, at 8 p.m. EDT.

Music
As Chocolate Droppa, his alias, he signed to Motown Records and released Kevin Hart: What Now? (The Mixtape Presents Chocolate Droppa), the soundtrack to his stand-up film of the same name. He released the singles "Push It On Me" featuring Trey Songz and "Baller Alert" with Migos & T.I.

Modeling
In 2017, Hart and Tommy John appeared in an underwear commercial for Macy's.

Hart House
In August 2022, Hart debuted a vegetarian restaurant, Hart House, intended to be the start of a restaurant chain able to compete with fast-food chains by "offering flavorful plant-based alternatives". The restaurant opened in Los Angeles, California, about a mile from Los Angeles International Airport (LAX), with a simple menu of veggie burgers and Chick'n products. The restaurant's offerings are claimed to be "entirely free of cholesterol, antibiotics, hormones, artificial colors, preservatives, high-fructose corn syrup, or trans fats", and inspired by Hart's own "health nut" lifestyle.

Influences
Hart has cited George Carlin, Dave Chappelle, Bill Cosby, Eddie Murphy, Patrice O'Neal, Richard Pryor, Keith Robinson, Chris Rock, and Jerry Seinfeld as his influences.

Legal issues
On April 14, 2013, Hart was charged on suspicion of drunk driving after his black Mercedes nearly collided with a tanker truck on a Southern California freeway. He failed a field sobriety test and was booked for misdemeanor DUI. On August 5, he was sentenced to three years of probation after pleading no contest to one count of driving under the influence of alcohol.

Personal life
Hart married Torrei in 2003, and they filed for divorce in 2010 after citing irreconcilable differences. Hart requested joint custody of their two children, daughter Heaven Leigh (born March 22, 2005) and son Hendrix (born October 8, 2007). The divorce was finalized in November 2011.

On August 18, 2014, Hart became engaged to Eniko Parrish. They were married near Santa Barbara, California, on August 13, 2016. Their son was born on November 21, 2017. A month later, he publicly admitted to having cheated on her while she was pregnant with their son. They reconciled and their second child together, a daughter, was born on September 29, 2020.

An avid poker player since around 2010, Hart has entered major tournaments such as the WSOP, cashing in one event for $4,783 in 2014. He also plays cash games, like the ones organized by PokerStars, and actually became their Brand Ambassador in 2017. As such, he was featured in PokerStars ad campaigns and promotional content, alongside Usain Bolt. As of September 2020, he has earned $47,828 in live tournament cashes.

On September 1, 2019, Hart was a passenger in a 1970 Plymouth Barracuda that went off Mulholland Highway and rolled down an embankment near Calabasas, California. He and the driver reportedly suffered "major back injuries" and were taken to separate hospitals. Hart was released from the hospital ten days later, and continued recovery at a rehabilitation facility.

Hart is a practicing Christian and has talked openly about his faith.

Work

Comedy 
Specials
 I'm a Grown Little Man (2009)
 Seriously Funny (2010)
 Laugh at My Pain (2011)
 Let Me Explain (2013)
 What Now? (2016)
 Irresponsible (2019)
 Zero F**ks Given (2020)

Television series 

 Real Husbands of Hollywood (2013-2016, 2022) (with Chris Spencer)

Discography 
 Kevin Hart: What Now? (The Mixtape Presents Chocolate Droppa) (2016)

Bibliography 
 I Can't Make This Up: Life Lessons (2017)
 The Decision: Overcoming Today's BS for Tomorrow's Success (2020)
 Marcus Makes a Movie (2021)
 Marcus Makes It Big (2022)
 Monsters and How to Tame Them: Taking Charge of the Voices in Your Head (2022)

Performances

Film

Television

Music videos

Tours 
 What Now? Tour (2015–2016)
 Irresponsible Tour (2017–2018)
 Reality Check Tour (2022)

Awards and nominations

References

External links

1979 births
Living people
21st-century American comedians
21st-century American male actors
21st-century American male writers
21st-century American screenwriters
African-American film producers
African-American male actors
African-American male comedians
African-American male writers
African-American screenwriters
African-American stand-up comedians
African-American television producers
American film producers
American male comedians
American male film actors
American male screenwriters
American male television actors
American male television writers
American male voice actors
American philanthropists
American stand-up comedians
American television writers
Comedians from Pennsylvania
Community College of Philadelphia alumni
Film producers from Pennsylvania
Male actors from Philadelphia
Screenwriters from Pennsylvania
Shorty Award winners
Television producers from Pennsylvania
Writers from Philadelphia